The 1971–72 Dallas Chaparrals season was the fifth season of the Chaparrals in the American Basketball Association. For the third straight season, the Chaps lost to the Stars in the Semifinals. This was the final playoff appearance for the team in Dallas before the move to San Antonio in 1974.

Roster 
 44 John Beasley - Power forward
 40 Len Chappell - Power forward
 4/21 Jeff Congdon - Point guard
 20 Donnie Freeman - Shooting guard
 15 Shaler Halimon - Small forward
 11 Joe Hamilton - Point guard
 54 Simmie Hill - Small forward
 25 George Johnson - Center
 43 Collis Jones - Power forward
 33 Rich Jones - SF
 23 Steve Jones - SG
 50 Goo Kennedy - Power forward
 55 Gene Moore - Center (traded to the New York Nets early in the season)
 52 Rich Niemann - Center
 15 George Peeples - Center
 13 Gene Phillips - Guard
 Bob Quick - Small forward
 15 Ron Sanford - Forward

Final standings

Western Division

Playoffs 
Western Division Semifinals

Chaparrals lose series 4–0

Awards and honors
1972 ABA All-Star Game selections (game played on January 29, 1972)
 Donnie Freeman
 Steve Jones

References

 Chaparrals on Basketball Reference

External links
 RememberTheABA.com 1971-72 regular season and playoff results
 RememberTheABA.com Dallas Chaparrals page

Dallas Chaparrals
Dallas
Dallas Chaparrals, 1971-72
Dallas Chaparrals, 1971-72